The Tower of Albu  is a ruined Genoese tower located in the commune of Ogliastro (Haute-Corse) on the west coast of the Cap Corse on Corsica.

History
The tower was one of a series of coastal defences constructed by the Republic of Genoa between 1530 and 1620 to stem the attacks by Barbary pirates. The tower was damaged in 1588 when Hassan Veneziano attacked the nearby village of Ogliastro and carried off several dozen villagers. A list of the towers defending the Corsican coastline compiled by the Genoese authorities in 1617 records that tower was guarded by men from the villages of Ogliastro and Olcani, but only during the night.
 
In 1992 the tower was listed as one of the official historical monuments of France.

See also
List of Genoese towers in Corsica

Notes

References

External links

 Includes information on how to reach 90 towers and many photographs.

Towers in Corsica
Monuments historiques of Corsica